Sultan Al-Tamihi is a Saudi Arabian football player who currently plays as a defender for Al-Anwar.

References

External links
Eurosport.com Profile 
Goalaz.com Profile 

FootMercato Profile 
hailoo Sport Profile
slstat.com Profile
SoccerPunter Profile

1986 births
Living people
Saudi Arabian footballers
Jeddah Club players
Al Nassr FC players
Al-Shoulla FC players
Al-Sadd FC (Saudi football club) players
Al-Thoqbah Club players
Al-Anwar Club players
Saudi First Division League players
Saudi Professional League players
Saudi Second Division players
Saudi Fourth Division players
Saudi Third Division players
Association football defenders